Mathis Rayan Cherki (born 17 August 2003) is a French professional footballer who plays as attacking midfielder for Ligue 1 club Lyon.

Early life 
Cherki was born on 17 August 2003 in the 3rd arrondissement of Lyon, France. Both of Cherki's parents are of Algerian descent; his father, Fabrice, is also of Italian descent.

Club career
Cherki is a product of the youth academy of Lyon, and is considered one of their best-ever prospects. He began playing with their reserve side in the Championnat National 2 at the age of 15. On 7 July 2019, Cherki signed his first professional contract with Lyon until 2022. He made his professional debut in a 0–0 Ligue 1 draw against Dijon on 19 October 2019.

After scoring four goals in the 2019–20 UEFA Youth League, he made his senior European debut on 27 November 2019 in a Champions League group stage game against Zenit, aged 16 years and 102 days, in which he substituted Maxwel Cornet in the 74th minute of a 2–0 loss. 

On 4 January 2020, Cherki scored his first senior goal as a substitute in a 7–0 win over Bourg-en-Bresse in the Coupe de France, becoming the youngest-ever player to score a senior goal for Lyon, aged 16 years and 140 days. On 18 January, he was involved in all four of Lyon's goals in a 4–3 win over Nantes in another Coupe de France match; he scored a brace, and assisted the other two goals.

On 19 August 2020, Cherki was subbed on in a UEFA Champions League match against Bayern Munich. In doing so, he became the youngest-ever player to feature in a UEFA Champions League semi-final. Lyon were knocked out of the competition in that match, losing by a score of 3–0 to the eventual winners.

Cherki scored his first Ligue 1 goal in a 3–2 win over Monaco on 2 May 2021. His goal secured the victory for Lyon in the final minutes of the match.

International career
Cherki is eligible to play for either France or Algeria, the latter due to his parents' origin. Cherki played for the France national under-16 team twice in 2018, both of which were friendlies against Denmark.

Career statistics

Club

Honours 
Lyon

 Coupe de la Ligue runner-up: 2019–20

References

External links

 Profile at the Olympique Lyonnais website
 
 
 
 

 

2003 births
Living people
French sportspeople of Algerian descent
French people of Italian descent
French footballers
Footballers from Lyon
Association football forwards
France under-21 international footballers
France youth international footballers
AS Saint-Priest players
Olympique Lyonnais players
Championnat National 2 players
Ligue 1 players